Divij Sharan and Ken Skupski were the defending champions but chose not to defend their title.

Kevin Krawietz and Albano Olivetti won the title after defeating Ruben Bemelmans and Adrián Menéndez-Maceiras 6–3, 7–6(7–4) in the final.

Seeds

Draw

References
 Main Draw

Guzzini Challenger - Doubles
Guzzini Challenger